Frank Murrey was an American football player and track athlete.  He played quarterback for Princeton University from 1918 to 1921 and was selected as an All-American quarterback by Walter Camp in 1918.  In 1920, Murrey ran 77 yards for a touchdown in Princeton's 14-0 victory over Navy.  The New York Times described the run as a "nerve-tingling moment" and a "dazzling serpentine gallop."  In 2000, Murrey was named as one of the backs on Princeton's All-Century Team 1900-99.

In 1921, he won the Elks Grand Prix, a 600-meter special invitation race featuring the nine top college stars.

References

Year of birth missing
Year of death missing
American football quarterbacks
Princeton Tigers football players
All-American college football players